Bazaria venosella is a species of snout moth in the genus Bazaria. It was described by Jan Asselbergs in 2009 and is known the Canary Islands.

References

Phycitini
Moths described in 2009
Moths of Africa